Grant Connell and Patrick Galbraith were the defending champions but they competed with different partners that year, Connell with Byron Black and Galbraith with Jonathan Stark.

Galbraith and Stark lost in the first round to David Adams and Menno Oosting.

Black and Connell lost in the semifinals to Yevgeny Kafelnikov and Daniel Vacek.

Jacco Eltingh and Paul Haarhuis won in the final 6–4, 4–6, 7–6 against Kafelnikov and Vacek.

Seeds
Champion seeds are indicated in bold text while text in italics indicates the round in which those seeds were eliminated. All eight seeded teams received byes into the second round.

Draw

Final

Top half

Bottom half

External links
 1996 Paris Open Doubles draw

1996 Paris Open
1996 ATP Tour